is a railway station on the Fujikyuko Line in Fujikawaguchiko, Yamanashi, Japan, operated by Fuji Kyuko (Fujikyu).

Lines

Station layout

The station is staffed and consists of two island platforms serving three tracks, numbered 1 to 3. Passengers access the platforms via a level crossing. It has waiting rooms and toilet facilities. The station is staffed.

Adjacent stations

History
Kawaguchiko Station opened on 24 August 1950. A new station building was completed on 24 March 2006.

Passenger statistics
In fiscal 2015, the station was used by an average of 2903 passengers daily.

Surrounding area
 Lake Kawaguchi
 Tenjō-Yama Park Mt. Kachi Kachi Ropeway
 Funatsu Elementary School

Bus services
 For Mount Fuji 5th stage
 For Mishima Station (transfer for Tokaido Shinkansen)
 For Gotemba Station and Gotemba Premium Outlets via Oshino and Lake Yamanaka
 For Fujisan Station via Fuji-Q Highland
 For Shin-Fuji Station (transfer for Tokaido Shinkansen) via Lake Motosu and Fujinomiya Station
 For Kofu Station via Isawa-onsen Station
 For Shinjuku Station, Tokyo Station, Haneda Airport, Shibuya Station,  Minami-ōsawa Station, Center-Kita Station, Machida Station,  Yokohama Station, Kaihimmakuhari Station, Fujisawa Station, Kōzu Station, Ōmiya Station, Shibukawa, Matsumoto Bus Terminal, Kanazawa Station, Shizuoka Station, Nagoya Station, Takayama Station, Ōsaka Abenobashi Station, and Hakata Station   (Highway Bus)

References

External links

 Fujikyu Railroad information
 Fujikyuko Train Timetable 
 Mount Fuji Bus Access (Fujikyu Bus)

Railway stations in Yamanashi Prefecture
Railway stations in Japan opened in 1950
Stations of Fuji Kyuko
Fujikawaguchiko, Yamanashi